Marrone is an Italian surname meaning "brown". Notable people with the surname include:

Doug Marrone (born 1964), American football coach
Emma Marrone (born 1984), Italian pop/rock singer
Fabrizia Marrone (born 1996), Italian softball player
José Marrone (1915–1990), Argentine actor and humorist
Luca Marrone (born  1990), Italian footballer
Michael Marrone (boxer) (born 1986), American boxer
Michael Marrone (footballer) (born 1987), Australian footballer
Mike Marrone (born 1985), American boxer

See also
Bruno & Marrone, a Brazilian sertanejo duo
Marone (surname)

Italian-language surnames